Max and Claire Brombacher House, also known as Hemlock Hill, is a historic home located at Brevard, Transylvania County, North Carolina.  It was built in 1940, and is a one-story, rectangular, Rustic style stone dwelling.  It has a pyramidal roof over the south block and a side-gable over the north wing.  It was constructed of irregular, jagged-edge stones by local stonemasons.

It was listed on the National Register of Historic Places in 2001.

References

External links

Houses on the National Register of Historic Places in North Carolina
Rustic architecture in North Carolina
Houses completed in 1940
Houses in Transylvania County, North Carolina
National Register of Historic Places in Transylvania County, North Carolina